The Riverview League is a Class A men's amateur "Town Ball" baseball league in the Southwest Twin Cities metro area.

Riverview League is an example of Town Team Baseball that remains popular in Minnesota, Nebraska, North Dakota, South Dakota and Wisconsin. The Riverview League is one of four metro area leagues that make up Minnesota Baseball Association Class A.

History 
Established in 1987, Riverview League teams have a strong history of success. Minnetonka Millers have won the Class A State Tournament 15 times, including a championship game win over league rival St. Louis Park Pirates in 2017. St. Louis Park has claimed three titles (2002, 2008, 2018).

Bloomington Bulldogs claimed the first-ever league title in 1987 and would go on to win the MBA Class A championship defeating Columbia Heights 8–4 in the final. The Bulldogs (1987, 1988) and Richfield Ramblers (2005) are the only teams other than Minnetonka and St. Louis Park to win a league championship.

Teams

Former league member teams 

 Bloomington Bulldogs
 Bloomington Redbirds
 Brooklyn Park Hodags
 Eden Prairie Eagles
 Edina E-SOX
Hamel Hawks (2017–20)
 Hort Hurricanes
 Maple Grove Crimson
 New Hope Athletics
 Northwest Suburban Red Hawks
 Park Center
 Richfield Ramblers
 Richfield Renegades
 South River Gnats
 Spring Lake Park
St. Louis Park Atomic
 Westside Bombers

League champions 

NOTE: state champion in bold

References

External links
 Riverview League
@RiverviewLeague on Twitter

1987 establishments in Minnesota
Amateur baseball in the United States
Baseball leagues in Minnesota
Sports leagues established in 1987